Frederick Knight may refer to:

Frederick Knight (politician) (1812–1897), British Conservative Party politician
Frederick Knight (singer) (born 1944), American R&B singer, songwriter and record producer
Frederick Knight (wrestler), British Olympic wrestler

See also
 Frederick Knight Hunt (1814–1854), English journalist and author